Odites notocapna is a moth in the family Depressariidae. It was described by Edward Meyrick in 1925. It is found in China and Russia (south-eastern Siberia).

References

Moths described in 1925
Odites
Taxa named by Edward Meyrick